This article shows a list of cities in Haiti.

List

See also
Arrondissements of Haiti
Departments of Haiti
List of communes of Haiti
Communal section

References

External links

 
Haiti
Haiti
Haiti
Cities